is a 2014 Japanese supernatural horror film directed by Takashi Miike. It was released on 23 August 2014.

Summary
A star, Miyuki Goto (Kō Shibasaki) plays Oiwa, the protagonist in a new play based on the ghost story Yotsuya Kaidan. She pulls some strings to get her lover, Kosuke Hasegawa (Ebizō Ichikawa XI) cast in the play, even though he's a relatively unknown actor. Other performers, Rio Asahina (Miho Nakanishi) and Jun Suzuki (Hideaki Itō), lust after Miyuki. Offstage, the cast's possessive love and obsessions exist as reality. Trapped between the play and reality, the cast's feelings for each other are amplified. When it becomes clear that love is not meant to be both on and off stage, love turns into a grudge and crosses the blurred line between reality and fantasy.

Cast
Ebizō Ichikawa XI as Kousuke Hasegawa/Tamiya Iemon
Kō Shibasaki as Miyuki Goto/Oiwa
Hideaki Itō as Jun Suzuki/Takuetsu
Miho Nakanishi as Rio Asahina/Itō Ume
Maiko as Kayoko Kurata
Toshie Negishi as Misuzu Horiuchi/Maki
Hiroshi Katsuno as Michisaburō Ogata/Tamiya Matazaemon
Ikkō Furuya as Kanji Shimada/Itō Kihei

Reception
On review aggregator website Rotten Tomatoes the film has an approval rating of 56% based on 9 critics, with an average rating of 7/10.

Dennis Harvey of Variety, after watching it screened at the Toronto International Film Festival, wrote: "Actors rehearsing a classic ghost tale find life imitating art in this atypically dull Takashi Miike opus".

References

External links
 

2010s Japanese films
2010s Japanese-language films
2014 horror films
Films directed by Takashi Miike
Japanese supernatural horror films
Films about actors
Films about theatre